The South Africa national handball team is the national handball team of South Africa under the control of South African Handball Federation.

African Championship record
1998 – 10th

See also
South Africa women's national handball team

References

External links
IHF profile

Men's national handball teams
Handball in South Africa
Handball